Poland competed at the 2000 Summer Olympics in Sydney, Australia. 187 competitors, 129 men and 58 women, took part in 133 events in 20 sports.

Medalists

Archery

Poland entered three women and two men in its seventh appearance in Olympic archery.  Four of the five archers won their first match, with Joanna Nowicka making it to the quarterfinal and taking eighth place.

Athletics

Men
Track & road events

Field events

Women
Track & road events

Field events

Combined events – Heptathlon

Badminton

Basketball

Team roster
Dorota Bukowska
Joanna Cupryś
Patrycja Czepiec
Katarzyna Dydek
Małgorzata Dydek
Edyta Koryzna
Ilona Mądra
Beata Predehl
Krystyna Szymańska-Lara
Elżbieta Trześniewska
Anna Wielebnowska
Sylwia Wlaźlak

Group play

Group B

Quarter-finals

Classification matches

Boxing

Men

Canoeing

Slalom

Sprint
Men

Women

Cycling

Road

Track
1000m time trial

Men's Sprint

Team sprint

Men's Keirin

Mountain biking

Fencing

Ten fencers, six men and four women, represented Poland in 2000.
Men

Women

Gymnastics

Artistic
Men

Women

Rhythmic gymnastics

Field hockey

Pool B

 Advanced to semifinals

Crossover

Eleventh and twelfth place

Team roster
 [01.] Paweł Sobczak (gk)
 [03.] Paweł Jakubiak
 [04.] Dariusz Małecki
 [06.] Tomasz Szmidt
 [07.] Robert Grzeszczak
 [08.] Zbigniew Juszczak
 [10.] Rafał Grotowski
 [13.] Krzysztof Wybieralski
 [14.] Tomasz Choczaj
 [15.] Piotr Mikuła
 [17.] Tomasz Cichy
 [19.] Dariusz Marcinkowski
 [20.] Łukasz Wybieralski
 [21.] Aleksander Korcz
 [25.] Eugeniusz Gaczkowski
 [30.] Marcin Pobuta (gk)
Head coach: Jerzy Wybieralski

Judo

Men

Women

Modern pentathlon

Rowing

Men

Women

Sailing

Poland competed in seven Sailing events with three top 10 finishes.

Men

Women

Open

Shooting

Men

Women

Swimming

Men

Women

Table tennis

Singles

Doubles

Weightlifting

Men

Women

Wrestling

Men's freestyle

Men's Greco-Roman

See also
Poland at the 2000 Summer Paralympics

Notes

Wallechinsky, David (2004). The Complete Book of the Summer Olympics (Athens 2004 Edition). Toronto, Canada. . 
International Olympic Committee (2001). The Results. Retrieved 12 November 2005.
Sydney Organising Committee for the Olympic Games (2001). Official Report of the XXVII Olympiad Volume 1: Preparing for the Games. Retrieved 20 November 2005.
Sydney Organising Committee for the Olympic Games (2001). Official Report of the XXVII Olympiad Volume 2: Celebrating the Games. Retrieved 20 November 2005.
Sydney Organising Committee for the Olympic Games (2001). The Results. Retrieved 20 November 2005.
International Olympic Committee Web Site

References

Nations at the 2000 Summer Olympics
2000
2000 in Polish sport